The Pfalz Dr.II was a German triplane fighter prototype of World War I built by Pfalz Flugzeugwerke.

Development
The Pfalz Dr.II was a lightweight development of the Dr.I with a reduced wing area. The first prototype had a 110 hp (81 kW) Oberursel Ur II engine, and the second prototype (Dr.IIa) used a Siemens-Halske Sh I engine, which developed the same power. However, the Dr.II did not enter production.

List of operators

Luftstreitkrafte

Specifications (Dr.IIa)

References

Bibliography
 
 

1910s German fighter aircraft
Dr.II
Triplanes
Rotary-engined aircraft
Aircraft first flown in 1917